Siege of Barcelona may refer to:

 Siege of Barcelona (801), during the Reconquista
 Siege of Barcelona (1462), during the Catalan Civil War
 Siege of Barcelona (1472), during the Catalan Civil War
 Siege of Barcelona (1651), during the Catalan Revolt
 Siege of Barcelona (1697), during the Nine Years' War
 Siege of Barcelona (1705), during the War of the Spanish Succession
 Siege of Barcelona (1706), during the War of the Spanish Succession
 Siege of Barcelona (1713–1714), during the War of the Spanish Succession
 Siege of Barcelona (1808), during the Peninsular War

See also
 The Surrender of Barcelona (1934–1937), a painting by Wyndham Lewis
 Battle of Barcelona